Daniel William Lewandowski (January 6, 1928 – July 19, 1996) was a Major League Baseball pitcher who played in two games with the St. Louis Cardinals in .

Sources

External links

1928 births
1996 deaths
Allentown Cardinals players
Augusta Rams players
Baseball players from New York (state)
Columbus Cardinals players
Columbus Red Birds players
Hamilton Cardinals players
Houston Buffaloes players
Macon Peaches players
Major League Baseball pitchers
People from Buffalo, New York
Rochester Red Wings players
St. Joseph Cardinals players
St. Louis Cardinals players